Bill Harte is a retired American soccer defender who played one season in Major League Soccer.

Harte attended Loyola University Maryland where he played on the men's soccer team from 1991 to 1993. In the summer of 1994, Harte played for the Washington Warthogs in the Continental Indoor Soccer League.  In October 1994, Harte signed with the Baltimore Bays of the USISL.  In the fall of 1996, he signed with the Baltimore Spirit of the National Professional Soccer League.  He played nine games for the Spirit before being waived on December 26, 1996.   On February 1, 1997, the New England Revolution selected Harte in the first round (third pick overall) of the Supplemental Draft.  On July 10, 1997, the Revolution sent Harte to the Tampa Bay Mutiny in exchange for Evans Wise.  The Mutiny waived Harte in November 1997.

Harte later worked for Adidas America.

References

External links
 All Time New England Revolution Roster

1971 births
Living people
American soccer players
Baltimore Bays (1993–1998) players
Baltimore Spirit players
Continental Indoor Soccer League players
Loyola Greyhounds men's soccer players
Major League Soccer players
National Professional Soccer League (1984–2001) players
New England Revolution players
Tampa Bay Mutiny players
USISL players
Washington Warthogs players
Worcester Wildfire players
USL Second Division players
A-League (1995–2004) players
New England Revolution draft picks
Association football defenders